Chaotic Dischord are a punk rock band from Bristol, England, allegedly formed by members of Vice Squad and their road crew in 1981. The band also recorded a one-off EP under the name Sex Aids.

History
Chaotic Dischord's line-up consisted of Ampex Oxobox (bass), Evo Stix (drums), Ransid (vocals), and Pox (guitars). The band originally formed to parody the pointlessness of many of the generic crusty second-wave punk bands that had been signed to Riot City Records, but ironically became one of the label's best-selling acts. After an argument with Riot City boss Simon Edwards, in which Dave Bateman and Shane Baldwin from Vice Squad claimed they could knock out something on the same lines as some of these bands 'in ten minutes', the band later went away and recorded "Glue Accident". They submitted the track under the name Chaotik Dischord, via a friend to Edwards who was looking for bands for his forthcoming Riotous Assembly compilation LP. To avoid Edwards learning their true identity they claimed that Vice Squad were friends of theirs and that they would only deal with them. It apparently "scared the pants off" Edwards, and he included the track on the album, misspelling their name as Chaotic Dischord, which would stick as the spelling from then on. Edwards eventually discovered the true identity of the band, but by then they were selling records in sufficient numbers to carry on.

Chaotic Dischord's brand of punk was aimed at shocking and insulting whoever they could, with one reviewer claiming that the band's aim was to use the word "fuck" more often than any other band before or after.  The band had several hits on the UK Indie Chart, and were received positively by many critics. United States hardcore punk fanzine Maximum Rock 'n' Roll, unaware of the band's true identity, gave the band several positive reviews despite a dislike for Vice Squad. Attila The Stockbroker, writing for Sounds under the pseudonym John Opposition gave their Fuck Religion... album 5 stars.

The band recorded a one-off EP, Back On The Piss Again, under the name Sex Aids, with Ampex on vocals.

When Beki Bondage left Vice Squad and moved to London, Ampex also departed, and despite his desire to stay with Chaotic Dischord, was sacked from the band. Bondage and Oxobox retaliated by releasing an album along with Mik Heslin (guitar) and Steve Roberts (drums) credited to the slightly differently spelled Chaotic Discord titled Fuck Off You Cunt!… What a Load of Bollocks!!!. The album was recorded over three nights with the musicians improvised the backing tracks on the first night, Beki added vocals the second night without having heard the music previously, and the mixing was done by engineer Paul Gadd with the rest of CD collapsed on the settee on the third night. When the band arrived, he asked,"How do you want this to sound?" The response was, "A pile of shit." The album was released on Syndicate records and sold well; the band made nothing on it.

The band released the Live In New York album in 1984 despite never actually having played a gig. The crowd noise on the album is from The Beatles show at Shea Stadium. When the Riot City label closed down, the band moved to Not Very Nice, continuing to release records, including three more albums. They eventually got bored with what was essentially the same joke, and split up in 1988 when Bambi's tool hire business took off.

The Comeback
After years of badgering by the festival organisers, Chaotic Dischord reformed to play Rebellion Festival 2020. When that obviously couldn't happen they were confirmed to play in 2021, to the same result. Fortunately Rebellion still wanted them and they're all set to play the 2022 festival. Unless anything terrible happens in between.

Rather enjoying all the attention, though, they played their first ever gig to a packed house at Exchange in Bristol in February 2022. They were terrible, of course.

Discography
Chart placings shown are from the UK Indie Chart.

Singles/EPs
Fuck The World 7-inch EP (1982) Riot City (#14)
Never Trust a Friend 7-inch (1983) Riot City (#30)
Back On The Piss Again 7-inch (1983) Riot City (#24) (as Sex Aids)
Don't Throw It All Away 12-inch (1984) Riot City (#14)

Albums
Fuck Religion, Fuck Politics, Fuck The Lot of You! (1983) Riot City
Don't Throw It All Away  (1984) Riot City
Live In New York (1984) Riot City
Fuck Off You Cunt!… What A Load Of Bollocks!!! (1984) Syndicate
Now! That's What I Call A Fucking Racket Vol. 1 (1985) Not Very Nice
Goat Fuckin' Virgin Killerz From Hell (1986) Not Very Nice
Very Fuckin' Bad (1988) Not Very Nice
Compilations, Re-issues, Bootlegs…
Riotous Assembly LP (1982) Riot City (as Chaotik Dischord - track entitled (Glue) Accident)
You've Got To Be Obscene To Be Heard LP (1988) Link (re-titled reissue of Fuck Off You Cunt!)
Their Greatest Fuckin' Hits CD (1994) Anagram
You've Got To Be Obscene To Be Heard CD (1995) Step-1 (cd re-issue of Fuck Off You Cunt!)
Fuck Religion.../Don't Throw It All Away LP/CD (1996) Visionary Vinyl/Anagram
Very Fuckin' Bad/Goat Fuckin' Virgin Killerz From Hell! CD (1996) Anagram
Now! That's What I Call A Fuckin' Racket CD (2001) Punkcore (includes Live In New York)

References

External links
Chaotic Dischord on Instagram
 Chaotic Dischord tribute site
Review of Fuck Religion,... from PunkNews.org

English punk rock groups
Musical groups from Bristol